Chlormezanone (marketed under the brandname Trancopal or Fenaprim) is a drug used as an anxiolytic and a muscle relaxant.

Its use was discontinued in many countries from 1996 on, due to rare but serious cases of toxic epidermal necrolysis.

Synthesis 

 Sterling Drug Inc.,  (1958).

References 
 
 
 
 

Muscle relaxants
Sulfones
Chloroarenes
Hepatotoxins
Withdrawn drugs
GABAA receptor positive allosteric modulators